You Don't Know Jack is a 2010 American made-for-television biopic written by Adam Mazer and directed by Barry Levinson. It stars Al Pacino, John Goodman, Danny Huston, Susan Sarandon, and Brenda Vaccaro.

The film dramatizes the efforts of former Oakland County, Michigan, pathologist Dr. Jack Kevorkian (Pacino) to help the terminally ill and the profoundly disabled end their lives.  The outspoken Kevorkian becomes a polarizing figure and he is often referred to as "Dr. Death" in the press.  He is assisted by his sister Margo Janus (Vaccaro), his longtime friend and medical technician Neal Nicol (Goodman), and Janet Good (Sarandon), who founded the eastern Michigan chapter of the Hemlock Society. By accepted accounts, he aided 130 people to die.

Kevorkian is unsuccessfully tried four times, but after taking an unprecedented direct role in the August 1998 death of his final patient, Thomas Youk, he is convicted of second degree murder and is sentenced to 10 to 25 years in prison.  He serves over eight years and is released in June 2007.

You Don't Know Jack's screenplay was based largely on the book Between the Dying and the Dead by Neal Nicol and Harry Wylie.  The film received numerous award nominations.  Al Pacino won Primetime Emmy, Golden Globe, and Screen Actors Guild awards for his performance as Kevorkian.  It received largely positive reviews and currently has a 91% rating at the aggregate film review website Rotten Tomatoes.

Plot
Prompted by the plight of David Rivlin, a quadriplegic who litigated to be removed from his respirator so he can die, the sight of a dying woman in a hospital bed, and the memory of his mother Satenig's death over two decades earlier, Dr. Jack Kevorkian builds his first "Mercitron". out of parts bought at a flea market.  He meets with Rivlin and presents his device.  Kevorkian explains that through an intravenous line, Rivlin can self-administer first a harmless saline solution, followed by thiopental that will cause him to fall into a coma, and then potassium chloride that will stop his heart, thus causing death.  Due to the expense and the difficulty of obtaining the drugs, Kevorkian later develops a less expensive method using tanks of carbon monoxide.  Rivlin, however, becomes agitated and Kevorkian is forced to leave.  Rivlin is later removed from his respirator and food and water are withheld.  In an interview with reporter Jack Lessenberry, Kevorkian denounces what he sees as the cruelty of his unnecessarily painful death, comparing it to the Holocaust.  He believes that his "death machine" would've brought about a quicker and easier death, and begins offering his services as a "death counselor". His first patient is Janet Adkins, a 53
-year-old woman from Portland, Oregon who is suffering from Alzheimer's disease. The disease is in its early stages, but Adkins is increasingly suffering from memory loss and confusion. With Kevorkian's help, she dies on June 4, 1990. Soon after Kevorkian begins aiding people in earnest.

As Kevorkian's notoriety increases, he provokes polarizing public opinion. His supporters believe he is performing a public service and that the government has no right to interfere with the decisions of competent individuals who want to die. He insists that he gives his patients a means to end their suffering; they alone made the decision and initiated the process. He also claims to have turned down 97 or 98 percent of the people asking for his help.  His critics, however, believe he is playing God. Conservative Oakland County prosecutor Richard Thompson believes Kevorkian is a murderer, but can't gain a conviction; he attributes his failures to Michigan's weak laws regarding assisted suicide and advocates stronger laws. In 1998, Thompson loses an election to a more liberal assistant prosecutor, David Gorcyca, who has no interest in wasting money (a major criticism of Thompson) prosecuting Jack Kevorkian as long as he only assists in suicides.

However, Thomas Youk's September 16, 1998 death is different.  Youk, reputed to be Jack Kevorkian's final patient, is so crippled by amyotrophic lateral sclerosis (ALS) so he cannot self-administer the drugs. Kevorkian administers it personally. A video of Youk's death is presented as part of Kevorkian's interview with reporter Mike Wallace of the CBS news program 60 Minutes. It leads to him being indicted. Despite the intervention of Youk's widow Melody and his brother Terry, he is convicted of second degree murder. Kevorkian represents himself while in previous cases, he was represented by attorney Geoffrey Fieger. He is sentenced to 10 to 25 years in prison.  He wants his case to be heard by the United States Supreme Court so that the issue of assisted suicide can be decided. The Court declined to do so, however. Kevorkian is released in June 2007 after serving over eight years.

Cast
 Al Pacino as Dr. Jack Kevorkian
 Danny Huston as Geoffrey Fieger, Kevorkian's attorney
 Susan Sarandon as Janet Good, a right-to-die advocate and patient
 Brenda Vaccaro as Margaret "Margo" Janus, Kevorkian's sister and assistant until her death in 1994
 John Goodman as Neal Nicol, Kevorkian's longtime friend and medical technician
 James Urbaniak as Jack Lessenberry, a reporter
 Eric Lange as John Skrzynski, an assistant prosecutor
 John Engler as himself (stock footage), Michigan governor from 1991 to 2003
 Richard E. Council as Judge David Breck
 Sandra Seacat as Janet Adkins, Kevorkian's first patient
 Adam Driver as Glen Stetson, a fictitious character who is a paraplegic who tried to immolate himself and is turned down by Kevorkian and Janet Good
 Cotter Smith as Dick Thompson, Oakland County prosecutor from 1989 to 1996
 David Wilson Barnes as David Gorcyca, Dick Thompson's successor as Oakland County prosecutor.  Successfully prosecutes Kevorkian in the death of Thomas Youk

Awards and nominations

Notes

References

External links
 
 
 
 

2010 television films
2010 films
2010 biographical drama films
American biographical drama films
Films scored by Marcelo Zarvos
Films about euthanasia
Films directed by Barry Levinson
Films set in the 1990s
Films shot in Michigan
Films shot in New York City
Medical-themed films
HBO Films films
2010s English-language films
American drama television films
2010s American films